Paul Twitchell (born Jacob Paul Twitchell) (died September 17, 1971) was an American author and spiritual teacher who created and directed the development of the new religious movement known as Eckankar.  Twitchell described himself as "The Mahanta, the Living ECK Master" from 1965 onward. These are terms without proven historical use prior to 1965 and founder Twitchell’s usage. He also ascribed to himself the name Peddar Zaskq in his writings.

Birth and early life
Paul Twitchell was born in Paducah, Kentucky to Effie Dorothy and Jacob Noah Twitchell. His date of birth has been given variously between 1908 and 1922, with the Library of Congress' Name Authority File giving 1908 and a spring 1910 census suggesting 1909. Upon Twitchell's death in 1971, his second wife Gail told the medical examiner that Paul was born on October 22, 1922, the same date presented in their marriage certificate. However, his marriage certificate with his first wife, Camille Bellowe, gave his date of birth as October 22, 1912.

Twitchell himself provided varying accounts of the circumstances of his birth. In his book The Spiritual Notebook, calling himself by his "spiritual name" Peddar Zaskq, Twitchell claimed to have been "born on a packetboat in the midst of the Mississippi River, a few minutes after a great earthquake shook the mid-South and formed a great lake in this region." That version echoed the tradition that a new Buddha is born
near water. In his biography In My Soul I am Free, authored by Brad Steiger, he claimed to have been born in a place called China Point, the location of which is not clear.

Following graduation from high school in Paducah, Twitchell attended Murray State Teachers College in Murray, Kentucky for two years before going to Western Kentucky State Teachers College, which he left in 1934 without having obtained a degree.

His first marriage was to Camille Ballowe, from Paducah, in Providence, Rhode Island, on August 12, 1942. He claims to have served in the United States Naval Reserve during World War II, from February 1942 until August 1945 when as Lieutenant Jg. he was honorably discharged. Twitchell became a correspondent for Our Navy magazine after the war for a short time. He later went on to become a freelance journalist, though he found success elusive.

Eckankar
Twitchell investigated a number of diverse spiritual movements and became an avid reader of spiritual, philosophical, religious and occult books at the library. In 1950, he joined Swami Premananda Giri's Self-Revelation Church of Absolute Monism, an offshoot of Paramahansa Yogananda's Self-Realization Fellowship. He lived on the grounds of the church, and edited its periodical, The Mystic Cross. In July 1955 Twitchell was arrested following violent fights with others living in the Swami’s compound. The Swami’s group terminated its relationship with Twitchell. A few months later his wife left him, they formally separated, and she remained in the compound for a short time. Their divorce was finalized in 1960.

Twitchell was initiated into the Surat Shabd Yoga by Kirpal Singh, Master of the Sant Mat group named "Ruhani Satsang," in October 1955 in Washington, D.C. He immediately became a devoted student of Singh, acknowledged experiences during Initiation and later on wrote to his master of his appearing in Twitchell's apartment and dictating discourses to him which he would type up and mail to Singh in New Delhi, India. By 1966 reports to Singh that Twitchell was teaching a program very similar to Sant Mat caused a serious disagreement between them which was never repaired. Weeks before Twitchell died he sent a letter to Singh denying he ever saw him as a 'master,' denied that he ever received any initiation from Singh because Singh had no power to give initiation, and claiming that Twitchell's spiritual achievements were gained years before they met. Twitchell also suggested that he never spiritually benefited from his connection with Singh.

However, in December 1963 Twitchell reportedly asked Singh to allow him to dedicate a book, The Tiger's Fang, in Singh's name. Twitchell wanted Singh's help to get it published and sent the manuscript for Singh's approval. Twitchell never received a positive response from Singh and following their disagreement in 1966 he asked for its return. He published it himself in 1967.

Twitchell's first known connection with L. Ron Hubbard (also a US Naval Reserve Officer during WW2 and pulp fiction author) was around 1950 during the Dianetics period. He again became involved in the Church of Scientology from about 1956 to 1959, becoming a member of the Church's staff and one of the first Scientologists to achieve the status of clear it was claimed. Twitchell taught classes, audited others, wrote articles for the magazines, and other activities for Scientology. He made many long term friendships during this time with the exception of Hubbard himself who later, circa 1968, listed Twitchell and Eckankar on their Suppressive Persons/Groups list. Hubbard described Twitchell not as ‘a clear’, as Twitchell always claimed, but as ‘aberrant’.

Moving to Seattle, Washington, in late 1960 after the death of his sister Kaydee (Katharine) in 1959, he met Gail Ann Atkinson in 1962. She was working part-time at the library, where they met, while doing an under-graduate degree. Twitchell later introduced her to the Ruhani Satsang teachings, as well as others, and Gail was also formally initiated by Singh in early December 1963 in San Francisco, during his second tour of the US. At the same time Twitchell relocated to San Francisco permanently. They married soon after on January 16, 1964, when Twitchell began more seriously writing and compiling materials about his new teaching, Eckankar. The first draft manuscript for The Far Country was written during this year. Twitchell also began having articles about Eckankar published in various newspapers and magazines.

In late 1964, they moved south to San Diego, where Twitchell gave his first lectures on Eckankar and what was then termed the "bilocation" technique, which he would later call "Soul Travel." Gail quit her studies to work full-time so that Twitchell could dedicate himself to establishing Eckankar as a new business venture. In spring 1965, he began a long-term series of regular lectures and workshops on Eckankar at the California Parapsychology Foundation in San Diego and also started selling monthly "Discourses" to interested students. By late 1965 the Twitchells had together founded the Eckankar Corporation as well as Illuminated Way Press, registering both as companies in California.

It is believed it was Twitchell's second wife who suggested that he adapt some of his spiritual education into a new religion. Twitchell said her encouragement was a spark for him to do something more with his writings. Critics state that at first Twitchell claimed his teachings were new but that he eventually referred to them as an ancient science that pre-dated all other major religious belief systems. Others say this interpretation is based on comments Twitchell made before he officially started Eckankar, when he was promoting what he called his "Cliff-Hanger" philosophy, which was an "outsider's" view on modern society. Those were indeed his own views and ideas. However, once he launched Eckankar in October 1965, he always referred to it as being an ancient teaching. In his book Eckankar: The Key to Secret Worlds, Twitchell lays out wide-ranging examples of the teaching down through history, while also explaining his own personal experiences with his teacher, "ECK master Rebazar Tarzs." The actual existence of "Rebazar Tarzs," like that of other Theosophical and ECK masters, remains disputed, since there is no evidence that anyone has seen Tarzs, other than the faith claims of Twitchell and his followers. Some believe Tarzs was a persona created by Twitchell to cover his previous associations with Kirpal Singh etc, or to provide the public with the image of a personally powerful and intellectual teacher.

After founding Eckankar, Twitchell wrote and published a series of books and personal study discourses, as well as giving talks around the world, writing thousands of letters to students, and continuing to write articles for magazines. He wrote a series of articles shortly after starting Eckankar that some critics have raised concerns about. In a series that Twitchell referred to as "The Man Who Talks To God," he poked fun at gurus, including himself. He says that he wrote the series in exchange for getting a booklet printed on Eckankar, during a time when he couldn't afford it himself. In that column he gave out spiritual advice, claiming to communicate with God about the problems of those who wrote to him. He included prophecy, predicting that the Vietnam War would end in 1968 and that Lyndon Johnson would be elected President of the United States for a second time. Many of his answers were concluded with the words "I HAVE SPOKEN!"

As a writer 
In 1984, Harold Klemp, the current spiritual leader of Eckankar—which keeps an archive of Twitchell's writings—commented on Twitchell as a writer: "He was an avid letter-writer, and he always kept a carbon copy ... At one time Paul made his living by writing for pulp magazines. He also wrote public-relations copy for the Navy... He sincerely cared about spiritual unfoldment and growth. He went through volumes of books on consciousness, a subject which was not in vogue in those days... he thrived on the study of different philosophies."

Klemp also describes Twitchell as a master compiler: "The high teachings of ECK had been scattered to the four corners of the world. The different masters each had parts and pieces of it, but they attached little requirements ... You must be a vegetarian, or you have to meditate so many hours a day ... Paul gathered up the whole teaching and took the best. Though it may be strange to say, in this sense I see him as a master compiler. He gathered the golden teachings that were scatted around the world and made them readily available to us."

In Paulji, A Memoir, Patti Simpson reveals how Twitchell put her in charge of a monthly communication to students called the Mystic World. It often contained many mistakes: stories that were supposed to continue on a certain page but didn't, stories stopping in mid-sentence, or the wrong names under pictures. Twitchell told her, "You have no idea ... how much help it will be to me if you can learn how to take care of this publication for me. I have so many books to get out, and I need to spend time on them."

Twitchell told famed writer on the paranormal Brad Steiger that he expected The Tiger's Fang to be controversial, having announced that it "would shake the foundation of the teachings of orthodox religions, philosophies, and metaphysical concepts."

Allegations of plagiarism 
In a 2006 article published in the 5 volume Introduction to New and Alternative Religions in America, David C. Lane, a professor of philosophy and sociology at Mt. San Antonio College, noted that a lot of Twitchell's Eckankar books contained lengthy passages from other authors' books without proper attribution or citation. In particular, Lane claims Twitchell's 1966 book The Far Country plagiarizes over 400 paragraphs from the books With a Great Master in India and The Path of the Masters by Julian Johnson without any acknowledgement. Three other books of Twitchell's, including The Tiger's Fang, Letters to Gail, and Shariyat-Ki-Sugmad, contain "almost verbatim" extracts from Johnson's 1939 book The Path of the Masters according to Lane. Lane notes that Twitchell wrote in at least two publications that he considered a book edited by Johnson—Sar Bachan—to be his "Bible".

Harold Klemp has responded to the plagiarism allegations by stating that Twitchell's role was that of "master compiler", saying "He gathered the golden teachings that were scattered around the world and made them readily available to us." However, Surat shabda yoga and the Sikh/Hindu guru systems were already available in 1965 through groups faithful to their sources.
In 2007, a member of Eckankar's clergy and Eckankar apologist since 1983, Doug Marman, published The Whole Truth, a biography of Paul Twitchell that disputes claims Lane made in The Making of a Spiritual Movement.
Lane has published commentary on Marman's book, reaffirming his view that Twitchell plagiarized several authors.

Lane has also alleged that Twitchell lied about his past and tried to cover up his earlier associations. Marman has responded by presenting documentation related to Twitchell's career and personal information.

Sampling
A sampling of three significant passages from Julian Johnson's The Path of the Masters (1985–1988 pagination), appearing in Twitchell's and Darwin Gross's works, displays the prose which has proven appealing to Western seekers:

Death
Twitchell died of a heart attack on September 17, 1971, in Cincinnati while attending an Eckankar seminar. Despite having formulated the Eckankar doctrine of named succession, he had not in fact designated anyone as his successor and his sudden death created difficulties for the movement's leadership group. It fell upon his widow to make the final decision, and she selected a second initiate and her current boyfriend Darwin Gross, who was himself succeeded later by Harold Klemp.

Books
Twitchell, Paul (1939, 1972) Coins of Gold. First edition: Paducah, Ky.: Press Pub. Co. Second edition Illuminated Way Press.
Twitchell, Paul (1966) Introduction to ECKANKAR. First edition Illuminated Way Press. no ISBN.
Twitchell, Paul (1967, 1988) The Tiger's Fang. First edition Lancer Books. Second edition ECKANKAR. 
Twitchell, Paul (1968, 1985) The Key to ECKANKAR. First edition Illuminated Way Press. Second edition ECKANKAR. 
Twitchell, Paul (1969, 2010) The Flute of God. First edition Illuminated Way Press. Second edition ECKANKAR. 
Twitchell, Paul (1969, 1987) Eckankar: The Key to Secret Worlds.  Foreword by Brad Steiger. First edition Lancer Books. Second edition ECKANKAR. 
Twitchell, Paul (1969, 1987) Anitya. First edition Illuminated Way Press. Second edition ECKANKAR.  
Twitchell, Paul (1970) The Drums of ECK. First edition Illuminated Way Press. 
Twitchell, Paul (1970) The Way of Dharma. First edition Illuminated Way Press. 
Twitchell, Paul (1970, 1972, 1990) Dialogues with the Master. First edition Stockton-Doty Trade Press. Second edition Illuminated Way Press. Third edition ECKANKAR. 
Twitchell, Paul (1970, 1971, 1990) The Far Country. First edition Stockton Trade Press. Second edition Illuminated Way Press. Third edition ECKANKAR.  PDF
Twitchell, Paul (1970, 1976, 1987) Stranger by the River. First edition Illuminated Way Press. Second edition Illuminated Way Press (non-standard). Third edition Eckankar. 
Twitchell, Paul (1970, 1987) The Shariyat-Ki-Sugmad, Book I. First edition Illuminated Way Press. Second edition Eckankar. 
Twitchell, Paul (1971, 1988) The Shariyat-Ki-Sugmad, Book II. First edition Illuminated Way Press. Second edition Eckankar. 
Twitchell, Paul (1971, 1990) The Spiritual Notebook. First edition Illuminated Way Press. Second edition ECKANKAR.  PDF
Twitchell, Paul (1971, 1986) Herbs: The Magic Healers. First edition Illuminated Way Press. Second edition ECKANKAR. Library of Congress Catalog Number: 86-80814
Twitchell, Paul (1972, 2010) The Eck-Vidya: Ancient Science of Prophecy. First edition Illuminated Way Press. Second edition ECKANKAR. 
Twitchell, Paul (1973, 1987) Letters to Gail, Volume I. First edition Illuminated Way Press. Second edition ECKANKAR. 
Twitchell, Paul (1974) Talons of Time. First edition Illuminated Way Press. No ISBN or LCCN.
Twitchell, Paul (1975) Eckankar: Illuminated Way Letters, 1966-1971. Letters he wrote until his death in 1971. 
Twitchell, Paul (1975) Eckankar: Compiled Writings, Volume 1. First edition Illuminated Way Press. 
Twitchell, Paul (1975) Eckankar Dictionary. First edition Illuminated Way Press. 
Twitchell, Paul (1977, 1987) Letters to Gail, Volume II. First edition Illuminated Way Press. Second edition ECKANKAR. 
Twitchell, Paul (1978) East of Danger. First edition Illuminated Way Press. Copyright Gail Twitchell Gross. 
Twitchell, Paul (1978) The Three Masks of Gaba. First edition Illuminated Way Press. 
Twitchell, Paul (1980) Difficulties of Becoming the Living ECK Master. First edition Illuminated Way Press. Compiled by Burnadine Burlin. 
Twitchell, Paul (1980) The Wisdom Notes. First edition ECKANKAR. 
Twitchell, Paul (1990) Letters to Gail, Volume III. First edition ECKANKAR. Library of Congress Catalog Number: 90-83659.
Twitchell, Paul (1999) Talons of Time. Graphic Novel. Authorized Eckankar edition. Illustrated by Mar Amongo. Ed. Harold Klemp and Joan Klemp. No ISBN or LCCN.
Twitchell, Paul (2004) The Tiger's Fang. Graphic Novel. Authorized Eckankar edition. Illustrated by Mar Amongo. Ed. Harold Klemp and Joan Klemp.

Notes

References

Bibliography
 Jarvis, Jack, "Paul Twitchell, Man of Parts" in Seattle Post-Intelligencer, July 9, 1963.
 Johnson, Ford. Confessions of a God Seeker: A Journey to Higher Consciousness. "One" Publishing, 2003.
 Johnson, Julian, The Path of the Masters: The Science of Surat Shabd Yoga: The Yoga of the Audible Life Stream, France, 1939; US, 1957; Beās, East Pañjāb: Radha Soami Satsang Beas, 1972, 1985, 1993. 
 Klemp, Harold. The Secret Teachings: Mahanta Transcripts, Book 3. Eckankar, 1989. LCCN 89-84193
 Lane, David Christopher, The Making of a Spiritual Movement: The Untold Story of Paul Twitchell and Eckankar, Del Mar Press, 1993. 
 Marman, Doug (2007), The Whole Truth: The Spiritual Legacy of Paul Twitchell. First edition, Spiritual Dialogues Project. 
 Simpson, Patti, Hello, Friend. Illuminated Way, 1981. . 2nd edition, Eckankar, 2002.
 Simpson, Patti (1985), Paulji, A Memoir. First edition, ECKANKAR. Library of Congress Catalog Number 85-81716.
 Steiger, Brad (1968), In My Soul I Am Free. First edition, Illuminated Way Press.  (Note: Almost 35% of the text is Paul Twitchell's own words.)
 Sykes, Joe, 2020, The Truth About Eckankar, 3rd edition. Independently published. 
 Wilson, George Tipton, "From Paducah to Eckankar" in The Courier-Journal, Louisville, Kentucky, 1982.

External links
Paul Twitchell article archive
 Dialogue in the age of Criticism
 A short biography of Paul Twitchell
 David C. Lane: The Making of a Spiritual Movement. Note: This book is also available online for free .
 Jacob Paul Twitchell
 Review of The Making of a Spiritual Movement

1971 deaths
Age controversies
American former Scientologists
American male non-fiction writers
American spiritual writers
Eck Masters
Founders of new religious movements
Murray State University alumni
People from Paducah, Kentucky
Psychokineticists
Western Kentucky University alumni
Year of birth uncertain